St. John's Fire District (STJFD) provides fire protection, rescue, and emergency medical services for John's Island, Kiawah Island, Seabrook Island, and Wadmalaw Island in South Carolina.

History

 1959 - St. John's Fire District begins operations
 1/1998 - Karl Ristow named Fire Chief
 7/2010 - Consolidates with Charleston County 911 Center
 7/2013 - Colleen Walz named Fire Chief
 7/2014 - New Headquarters and emergency operations center opens

The St. John's Fire District operates out of seven fire stations, strategically located throughout the fire district under the command of one battalion chief. The STJFD  delivers service through a frontline fleet of seven engines, two ladder, one tower, one water tender, and one fire boat. District headquarters are located at 1148 Main Road on John's Island.

Stations and apparatus

Fire apparatus livery
The St. John's Fire District utilizes a unique livery consisting of a white body and a red cab roof accompanied by red and gold reflective striping.

References

Fire departments in South Carolina
Fire protection districts in the United States